The acts of the 111th United States Congress include all laws enacted and treaties ratified by the 111th United States Congress, which lasted from January 3, 2009 to January 3, 2011. Such acts include public and private laws, which were enacted after being passed by Congress and signed by the President.   There were no overridden vetoes.

Summary of actions 
Of the statutes enacted by Congress, only the first was promulgated by President George W. Bush in the last week of his term. The remainder were signed by President Barack Obama. Only one was vetoed.

Public laws

Private laws

Treaties

See also 
List of United States federal legislation
Acts of the 110th United States Congress
Acts of the 112th United States Congress

External links 

 Authenticated Public and Private Laws: Browse 111th Congress from the Government Printing Office
 Legislation & Records Home: Treaties from the Senate
 Private Laws for the 111th Congress at Congress.gov
 Public Laws for the 111th Congress at Congress.gov
 

111